Caeso Duilius (  336–334 BC) was a Roman general and statesman. As consul in 336 BC, he and his colleague in office, Lucius Papirius Crassus, waged war against the Ausoni and Sidicini. In 334 BC, Duilius was the member of a three-man board to establish a colony at Cales, which Rome had conquered the previous year. Weigel (p. 226) notes that Duilius is the first attested plebeian member of a colonial commission.

References
 
 
 

4th-century BC Roman consuls
4th-century BC Roman generals
Caeso